Normahl (written: NoRMAhl, meaning  "normal" in German) is a German punk band formed in 1978 in Winnenden near Stuttgart by five high school students.  Their music is upbeat and typically classified as punk pathetique ('pret-punk', or 'fun-punk') as well as Deutschpunk.  Their lyrics sometimes deals with themes like sex, drugs, and partying. However Normahl's songs also notably address left-political themes such as police violence, xenophobia, nationalism, anarchy, capitalism, and resistance to fascism, often in a humorous way.

Discography

Albums 
1980 Stuttgart über alles (EP) (Stuttgart over all)
1981 Verarschung Total (LP)
1984 Ein Volk steht hinter uns (LP) (The people are behind us)
1984 Der Adler ist gelandet (LP) (The eagle has landed)
1985 Harte Nächte (LP) (Hard nights)
1986 Lebendig I - Live in Switzerland (LP/live) (Alive I - Live in Switzerland)
1988 Biervampir (Maxi-Single) (beer vampire)
1989 Kein Bier vor vier (LP) (No beer before four)
1991 Blumen im Müll (CD/LP) (Flowers in the garbage)
1993 Auszeit (CD/LP) (Time out)
1994 Lebendig II - Ernst ist das Leben (CD/live) (Alive II - Life is serious)
1994 Lebendig III - Heiter ist die Kunst (CD/ live) (Alive II - Art is funny)
2002 IN RI 21 (CD)
2003 Das ist Punk – Best of...(CD) (This is Punk - best of)
2005 Voll Assi (CD) (Totally associal)
2010 "Jong'r" (CD/DVD)
 2011: Normahl Best: Punk ist keine Religion (CD)
 2015: Friede den Hütten, Krieg den Palästen (CD und LP)

Singles
1987 "Harte Nächte" (Single) (Hard Night)
1987 "Fraggles" (Single)
1989 "Hans im Glück" (Single) (Lucky Hans)
1990 "Merry Jingle" (Single)
1991 "Geh wie ein Tiger" (Single/ Maxi CD) (Walk like a tiger)
1992 "Drecksau" (Maxi CD) (Dirty pig)
1992 "Diplomatenjagd" (Maxi CD) (Hunt the diplomat)
1993 "Weit weg" (Maxi CD) (Far away)
2000 "Sex am Telefon" (Maxi CD) (Sex on the telephone)
2005 "Sonne im Dezember" (Maxi CD)
2006 "Wenn ein Tor fällt..."(Maxi CD) (When a goal is shot...)
2011: Nach all den Jahren
2016: Kapitalistenlied
2017: Freiheit
2022: Das Narrenschiff-Single Edit
2022: Waldfest

Weblinks 
 Official Webpage

References

German punk rock groups
Deutschpunk
1978 establishments in Germany